Live in Italy may refer to:

Live in Italy (Lou Reed album)
Live in Italy (21st Century Schizoid Band album)
Live in Italy (Sham 69 album)